Wayne Jarratt (19 April 1957 – 14 May 1988) was an Australian stage and television actor in the 1980s, remembered for his role in internationally renowned TV cult series Prisoner as friendly prison officer Steve Faulkner. He played the part for 71 episodes, as a supporting cast member first appearing in the penultimate episode of Season 3 (10 November 1981), but opted to leave the series to take a stage role. His final appearance was in Season 4, bowing out in Episode 316 (5 October 1982).

Jarratt attended Balgowlah Boys High in Sydney from 1969–1974. He died of a brain tumour at the age of 31.

Filmography

External links

1957 births
1988 deaths
Australian male soap opera actors
Australian male stage actors
20th-century Australian male actors